The Barkakana–Muri–Chandil line is an Indian railway line connecting Barkakana and Muri with  on the Asansol–Tatanagar–Kharagpur line. This  track is under the jurisdiction of South Eastern Railway.

History
The Bengal Nagpur Railway was formed in 1887 for the purpose of upgrading the Nagpur Chhattisgarh Railway and then extending it via Bilaspur to Asansol, in order to develop a shorter Howrah–Mumbai route than the one via Allahabad. The Bengal Nagpur Railway main line from Nagpur to Asansol, on the Howrah–Delhi main line, was opened for goods traffic on 1 February 1891.

The Chandil–Barkakana line was opened for traffic in 1927.

Route diversion 

Electrification
The Chandil–Gondabihar, Gondabihar–Tiruldih and Barkakana–Ramgarh Halt sectors were electrified in 1996–97. The Tiruldih–Ramgarh sector was electrified in 1997–98.

References

|

5 ft 6 in gauge railways in India
Rail transport in West Bengal
Rail transport in Jharkhand

Transport in Asansol
Transport in Jamshedpur
Transport in Kharagpur